Charles Edward Bothwell (May 26, 1882 – August 28, 1967) was a Canadian politician and barrister.

Born in Owen Sound, Ontario, Bothwell was elected to the House of Commons of Canada as a Member of the Liberal Party in 1925 to represent the riding of Swift Current. He was re-elected in 1926, 1930 and 1935. During the 18th Parliament, he was Chairman of the House of Commons Special Committee on Elections and Franchise Acts.

References

 

1882 births
1967 deaths
Liberal Party of Canada MPs
Members of the House of Commons of Canada from Saskatchewan